Mexico has experienced many changes in territorial organization during its history as an independent state. The territorial boundaries of Mexico were affected by presidential and imperial decrees. One such decree was the Law of Bases for the Convocation of the Constituent Congress to the Constitutive Act of the Mexican Federation, which determined the national land area as the result of integration of the jurisdictions that corresponded to New Spain, the Captaincy General of Yucatán, the Captaincy General of Guatemala and the autonomous Kingdoms of East and West. The decree resulted in the independence from Spain.

Organizations

Subdivision by intendancies 

During the period of the Independence of Mexico, part of the territorial organization of New Spain was integrated into the new nation of the Mexican Empire. Added to this were the Captaincy General of Yucatán and the Captaincy General of Guatemala (whose annexation was a strategy to counteract the Spanish crown). This yielded Mexico's largest land area as an independent nation.

Subdivision by state and territory 
During the structuring of the Republic, territorial and legal changes reaffirmed the Catholic Church's status as the only religion for Mexicans. The new nation developed a popular and representative federal republic that recognized the sovereignty of the States constituting the federal union.

Subdivision by department 
The liberal government of Antonio López de Santa Anna, influenced by conservatives, ratified the Seven Laws by presidential decree, establishing a new territorial court and replacing the federal states by departments whose governors and legislators would be selected by the President. This break from federalism brought Mexico its most turbulent and unstable era.

During the Second Mexican Empire, Emperor Maximilian I of Mexico made a new division of national territory.

Territorial divisions throughout Mexican history were generally linked to political change and programs aimed at improving the administrative, country's economic and social development. On 3 March 1865, one of the most important decrees of the government of Maximilian, the first division of the territory of the new Empire, was issued and published in the Journal of the Empire on 13 March. The reorganization was accomplished by Manuel Orozco y Berra (1816–1881), and was made according to the following rules:

 The total land area of the country will be divided into at least fifty departments.
 Whenever possible, natural features will be used for boundaries.
 The surface area of each department will take into account the terrain, weather, and all elements of production, so that (eventually) the departments will hold an equal number of inhabitants.

This division was of great importance, because geographical features and projected development were taken into account for the delimitation of the jurisdictions.

The territorial division of the Second Mexican Empire was used for a short period because the Empire was overthrown in early 1867 with the execution of Maximilian I. The Federal Republic, and its former divisions, were restored in that year.

Clarifications
Several of the former borders of the states and territories in northern Mexico remain unclear. The northern border of Sonora, for example, is described in various ways, either as the Gila River or the Colorado River. The list of acts is not affected by this confusion, but the associated maps contain the following uncertainties and omissions:

Some of the borders of states in the north, and in northeast Texas, before independence and the Mexican Cession

 The territorial extent of the Santa Fe de Nuevo México Territory
 The exact date that the division between Durango and Chihuahua stopped being a straight line
 Several minor adjustments to the border with the United States, including the Chamizal dispute are not specified
 The Republic of Baja California and Republic of Sonora – proclaimed by the American William Walker in 1854, were never more than a declaration and are not shown on maps.
 The following maps do not show the separation of Zacatecas (in 1835) and Tabasco (in 1841–1842), which never became independent republics and were never proclaimed as such.
 The maps do not show the claim of Mexico on part of the former British Honduras, today called Belize.

Territorial evolution of Mexico

Timeline

1821–1824

1824–1857

1857–1917

1917–present

The Centralist Republic

The Seven Constitutional Laws 

By the law of October 3, 1835, the centralist system was introduced in the country. The entities that formed the Republic lost their freedom, independence and sovereignty, becoming entirely subordinate to the central government.

The Seven Constitutional Laws were enacted on December 30, 1836. The sixth discussed the territorial configuration in its first and second articles. Shortly thereafter, the Eighth Organic Base—a separate statute from the Seven Laws—was enacted. The first article stipulated that the country would be composed of many departments, corresponding to the previously existing states, except that:
 Coahuila and Texas were separated into two different departments
 Colima Territory would be integrated into the Michoacán Department
 Tlaxcala Territory would be integrated into the Mexico Department
 The Federal District was eliminated

Accordingly, the new territorial division was composed of 24 departments.  That initial territorial composition was regarded as final until 30 June 1838, by law of that date.

This period created a great political instability that began in regional problems and conflicts between the central entity and the states of the country. Rebellions were raised in several places, among which the following were particularly distinguished:

 Zacatecas was the first state to declare itself against centralism in the so-called 1835 Revolt in Zacatecas, which was quickly extinguished. As punishment for this rebellion, part of the territory of Zacatecas was split off and turned into the Aguascalientes Territory
 The Texas region of the state of Coahuila and Texas declared its independence from Mexico on October 2, 1835, forming the Republic of Texas
 Coahuila, Nuevo León, and Tamaulipas declared themselves independent of Mexico on January 17, 1840, as the Republic of the Rio Grande. The Republic was never truly independent, since the rebels were quickly overthrown. The Republic was dissolved on 6 November 1840
 Yucatán, which had joined to the federation under the condition of a Federated Republic, declared its independence in 1840 (officially on October 1, 1841). This historic event resulted in the birth of the second Republic of Yucatán, which returned permanently to the nation in 1848
 Tabasco, due to conflicts with the new centralized system, declared independence from Mexico on 13 February 1841, returning to the nation on December 2, 1842

On August 22, 1846, due to the war with the United States, the Federal Constitution of the United Mexican States of 1824 was restored. There remained the separation of Yucatán, but 2 years later Yucatán definitively rejoined Mexico.

The Basis for Administration of the Republic 

A change in the governance of the country was determined by the Decree of 22 April 1853, which from that moment recognized the Basis for the Administration of the Republic as the fundamental law for the reorganization of government.

In this precept, in the first and second articles, the Section of Internal Governance, the independence and sovereignty of states were abolished, although the name "states" was retained.

In the third article districts, cities, or towns that had been separated from the states and divisions to which they belonged were returned to their original conditions. This excluded Aguascalientes, which continued to be considered a district of Zacatecas.

In a statement by the Ministry of War, on September 21, 1853, it was decided that states would instead be called "departments".

Changes in the territorial division, according to the code above, were established according to several decrees:

May 29, 1853, establishing the Tehuantepec Territory, its capital city at Minatitlan
October 16, 1853, establishing the Isla del Carmen Territory
December 1, 1853, establishing the Sierra Gorda Territory, its capital city at San Luis de la Paz
December 1, 1853, adding Tuxpan District to the Veracruz Department
December 10, 1853, redesignating Aguascalientes District as Aguascalientes Department
February 16, 1854 creating, despite the centralist system, a kind of Federal District
July 20, 1854, approving the Treaty of Mesilla, which amended the border with the United States of America through the loss of territory of Chihuahua and Sonora.

Plan of Ayutla 
The Plan of Ayutla was a political statement proclaimed on March 1, 1854 in Ayutla, Guerrero, and was intended to end the presidency of Antonio López de Santa Anna.

The plan was revised in Acapulco on 11 March 1854, by changing its second article to respect in principle the territorial division and to create a representative from each department and territory.

The Provisional Organic Statute (known as Lafragua Code) was promulgated on May 15, 1856. It provided the legal basis for governing the country in the period between the Plan of Ayutla and Federal Constitution of the United Mexican States of 1857. That document left open a later choice for federalism or centralism, but encouraged federalism because it called the entities that formed the Republic States. Thus, in its 2nd article, it retained the previous territorial division, and determined the existence of 22 states, the District of the capital, and 6 territories.

The Constitution of 1857 was drafted during the presidency of Ignacio Comonfort, who was sworn in on February 5, 1857. The Constitution contained the essence of the 1824 document (i.e. the federal character of the state and the democratic system of representative and republican government), but established freedom of religion and ended the domain of the Catholic Church as the sole and official religion of the country. It set out, in Article 43, the parties making up the federation – 24 states, 1 federal territory, and the Federal District known as the Valley of Mexico (today Mexico City). The territories of Sierra Gorda, Tehuantepec and Isla del Carmen, and Nuevo León as an independent state, disappeared (Nuevo León was later restored).

References

 
Subdivisions of Mexico
History of Mexico
Borders of Mexico
Timelines of North American history